Ben Boyd may refer to:

 Benjamin Boyd (1801–1851), Scottish-born Australian pioneer and entrepreneur
 Benjamin Boyd (South Carolina), intendent (mayor) of Charleston, South Carolina
 Ben Boyd (baseball) (1858–?), African-American baseball player